The following elections occurred in the year 1885:

Africa
 1885 Liberian general election

North America

Canada
 1885 Newfoundland general election
 1885 Northwest Territories election

United States
 1885 New York state election
 United States Senate election in New York, 1885

Europe
 1885 French legislative election
 1885 Norwegian parliamentary election

United Kingdom
 1885 United Kingdom general election

See also
 :Category:1885 elections

1885
Elections